This is a list of broadcast television stations that are licensed in the U.S. state of Michigan.

Full-power stations
VC refers to the station's PSIP virtual channel. RF refers to the station's physical RF channel.

Defunct full-power stations
Channel 8: WDHS - Iron Mountain (1986 – November 19, 2015)
Channel 16: WTAC-TV - ABC/DuMont - Flint (1953–1954)
Channel 18: WHTV - Bloomberg/UPN/MNT/JTV - Jackson (August 20, 1999 – August 31, 2017)
Channel 20: WPAG-TV - Ann Arbor (April 3, 1953 – December 31, 1957)
Channel 20: WJMY - Allen Park (October 7, 1962 – June 10, 1963)
Channe 28: WCMZ-TV - PBS - Flint (August 23, 1980 – April 24, 2018)
Channel 54: WILS-TV/WTOM-TV - DuMont - Lansing (September 20, 1953 – October 9, 1956)
Channel 64: WBKZ-TV - Battle Creek (May 22, 1953 – April 23, 1954)

LPTV stations

Translators

Cable-only stations
Alpena CW - The CW Plus - Alpena

References

External links
Station Listings/Dial Pages: Michigan's Broadcast Guide

Michigan

Television stations